Wopamo Osaisai (born September 13, 1986, in Oakland, CA) was a professional Canadian football cornerback with the Montreal Alouettes of the Canadian Football League. He had also played for the Edmonton Eskimos. In his first game ever as an Edmonton Eskimo he caught an interception.

External links
 CFL Player page

1986 births
Living people
Stanford Cardinal football players
Players of Canadian football from Oakland, California
Edmonton Elks players
Montreal Alouettes players
African-American players of Canadian football
American players of Canadian football
Canadian football defensive backs
21st-century African-American sportspeople
20th-century African-American people